Queen Mother Tshering Yangdon (born 21 June 1959) is the third wife of the former Bhutanese king, Jigme Singye Wangchuck. She is the current Queen Mother (Gyalyum Kude, literally meaning "Queen Mother") of Bhutan, as she is the mother of the current Bhutanese king Jigme Khesar Namgyel Wangchuck. She is also the mother of King Jigme Khesar's two younger full siblings, Princess Ashi Dechen Yangzom (b. 1981) and Prince Gyaltshab Jigme Dorji (b. 1986).

Biography 
Her father, Yab Dasho Ugyen Dorji (1925–2019), was the Founder and Proprietor of Ugyen Academy (03/04/2002). Her mother is Yum Thuiji Zam (b. 1932).

She was educated at St. Joseph's Convent, Kalimpong, and St. Helen's School, Kurseong, India.

Humanitarian causes 
The Queen founded Bhutan Nun's Foundation (BNF) in March 2009. The foundation's focus is to make nunneries a way to help and empower girls and women through education and economic self-sufficiency.

She was responsible for the building of the Khamsum Yulley Namgyal Chörten in Punakha Valley in 2004.

Children 
She had, with the former king, the following children:

Patronages 
 Royal Patron of the Royal Society for the Protection and Care of Animals.
 Royal Patron of the Royal Bhutan Flower Exhibition.

References

Notes 

Bhutanese monarchy
Living people
1959 births
Queen mothers
Wangchuck dynasty